Crime Unlimited is a 1935 British crime film that was made as a Quota quickie. It was directed by Ralph Ince. The film marked the English-language debut of Lilli Palmer.

Plot
The Merrick gang pull off a diamond robbery and murder a police officer investigating their crimes. A paper with the cryptic writing "AD 1935" is found on the murdered officer's body. Outsmarted by the gang, the police assistant commissioner and Inspector Cardby decide to have Pete Borden, a new recruit who the gang would not know, go undercover and join the gang.

When he enters a casino, Natascha is sent to check him out. He pretends to be looking for a fence to sell his stolen jewelry. Reassured, the gang recruits him. Merrick (the gang's mysterious leader who never lets anyone see him face to face) first assigns him to check on Delaney, a crooked bookie. Pete then meets Newell, a lawyer. The gang then installs Pete in a flat; he tosses a note containing the address to a policeman when no one is looking. Two police detectives let the flat opposite. One of them is deaf, and equipped with binoculars, can read Pete's lips when he silently mouths what he has discovered.

The gang plans to steal the necklace of prominent socialite Lady Mead at a party she is giving. Pete goes to the party with Natascha, while the police attend the party undercover, and send Lady Sybil, a society gossip columnist, to observe. At the party, Pete runs into Conway Addison, a lawyer. The lights go out, and when it goes back on, Natascha has escaped with the stolen necklace. Inspector Cardby pretends to arrest Pete, but lets him go once they are outside.

Natascha later visits Pete and tells him that she wants to leave the gang, but one of the crooks is eavesdropping. She claims Merrick sent her to test Pete. The gangster checks with his boss and finds out she was lying.

With his plans being tipped off to the police, Merrick soon suspects Pete. This is confirmed when the police notify the next target, who notifies Merrick. The mastermind pretends to accept Pete's proposal for a robbery. However, while the police are waiting for them there, the gang actually strike elsewhere.

Pete is taken to an isolated country house. Merrick finally lets Pete see him, as he intends to kill the policeman; it is Conway Addison. Addison explains he took to crime after becoming bored with his job. While Natascha is being taken to the same place, she causes the car to go off the road. She then tells a police officer where she was heading. To avoid tipping Merrick off, she shows up at the house. Merrick, having decided to retire, tries to gas the whole gang, Pete and Natasha to cover his tracks. However, Pete manages to break out of the locked room, and the police arrive in time to shoot Conway and arrest the rest of his gang.

Cast
Esmond Knight as Pete Borden 
Lilli Palmer as Natasha 
Cecil Parker as Assistant Commissioner 
George Merritt as Detective Inspector Cardby
Richard Grey as Detective Inspector Hall
Raymond Lovell as Delaney 
Graham Soutten as Clancy (as Ben Soutten)
Peter Gawthorne as A. D. Newall 
Wyndham Goldie as Conway Addison 
Jane Millican as Lady Sybil 
Stella Arbenina as Lady Mead
Bellenden Clarke as Lord Mead

Critical reception
TV Guide described it as a "pedestrian picture," and a "totally undistinguished film"; whereas Britmovie called it a "vigourous quota-quickie crime-drama based on David Hume ‘Cardby’ thriller novels".

References

External links

1935 films
1935 crime films
British black-and-white films
British crime films
1930s English-language films
Films based on British novels
Films directed by Ralph Ince
Films set in London
1930s British films